The women's 3000 metres speed skating event was part of the speed skating at the 1960 Winter Olympics programme. It was the first appearance of women's speed skating events at the Olympics and the 3000 metres were the last contest at this Games. The competition was held on the Squaw Valley Olympic Skating Rink and for the first time at the Olympics on artificially frozen ice. It was held on Tuesday, February 23, 1960. Twenty speed skaters from ten nations competed.

Medalists

Records
These were the standing world and Olympic records (in minutes) prior to the 1960 Winter Olympics.

(*) The record was set in a high altitude venue (more than 1000 metres above sea level) and on naturally frozen ice.

The development of the Olympic record was the following: Gisela Toews with 5:48.3 minutes (winning the first pair), Elsa Einarsson with 5:32.2 minutes, Tamara Rylova with 5:30.0 minutes, Helena Pilejczyk with 5:26.2 minutes, Christina Scherling with 5:25.5 minutes, Valentina Stenina with 5:16.9 minutes, and finally the new Olympic record was set by Lidiya Skoblikova with 5:14.3 minutes.

Results

References

External links
Official Olympic Report
 

Women's speed skating at the 1960 Winter Olympics
Olymp
Skat